The State Register of Heritage Places is maintained by the Heritage Council of Western Australia. , 64 places are heritage-listed in the Shire of Nungarin, of which eight are on the State Register of Heritage Places.

List
The Western Australian State Register of Heritage Places, lists the following eight state registered places within the Shire of Nungarin:

References

Nungarin
State Register of Heritage Places in the Shire of Nungarin